The 2022 Alabama Crimson Tide baseball team represents the University of Alabama in the 2022 NCAA Division I baseball season. The Crimson Tide play their home games at Sewell–Thomas Stadium.

Previous season

The Crimson Tide finished 32–26, 12–17 in the SEC to finish in fifth place in the West division. They were invited to the Ruston Regional where they finished 1–2.

Schedule and results

Standings

Results

See also
2022 Alabama Crimson Tide softball team

References

Alabama
Alabama Crimson Tide baseball seasons
Alabama Crimson Tide baseball
Alabama